Dautana is a semi-urban village situated in NH2 Delhi Agra Highway. Dautana village is located in Chhata Tehsil of Mathura district in Uttar Pradesh, India.
Dautana

References

Villages in Mathura district